La Notte is a 1961 Italian drama film directed by Michelangelo Antonioni.

La Notte (Italian for The Night) may also refer to:

 La Notte (album), a 2013 album by Norwegian pianist Ketil Bjørnstad
 Nativity (Correggio) or La Notte, a 1529–1530 painting by Antonio da Correggio
 La Notte (newspaper), an Italian afternoon newspaper published from 1952  –1995
 "La notte" (song), a 2012 song by Arisa
 The title of several compositions by Franz Liszt
 The second piece of the Trois Odes funèbres; see 
 The title of several compositions by Antonio Vivaldi
 Flute Concerto No. 2 in G minor, RV 439; see Six Flute Concertos, Op. 10 (Vivaldi)
 Silvia La Notte (born 1982), Italian kickboxer

See also
 Lanotte, a surname
 Notte, a river of Brandenburg, Germany